Nationality words link to articles with information on the nation's poetry or literature (for instance, Irish or France).

Events
December 19 – Ted Hughes' appointment as Poet Laureate of the United Kingdom in succession to Sir John Betjeman is announced, Philip Larkin having turned down the post.
 After Ghazi al-Gosaibi, the Saudi Arabian minister of health, publishes a poem, "A Pen Bought and Sold", that criticizes the corruption and privilege of the country's elite, he is dismissed from his post.
 Prvoslav Vujčić's second collection of poems, Kastriranje vetra ("Castration of the Wind"), written during a week's imprisonment in Tuzla for criticising the state, is prohibited in Yugoslavia.
 Scottish Poetry Library established.

Works published in English
Listed by nation where the work was first published and again by the poet's native land, if different; substantially revised works listed separately:

Australia
 Robert Gray, The Skylight
 Jeff Guess, Leaving Maps, Adelaide: Friendly Street Poets
 Chris Wallace-Crabbe, D. Goodman and D.J. Hearn, editors, Clubbing of the Gunfire: 101 Australian War Poems, Melbourne: Melbourne University Press, anthology

Canada
 Roo Borson, The Whole Night, Coming Home,  (nominated for a Governor General's Award) American-Canadian
 Dionne Brand, Chronicles of the Hostile Sun
 Leonard Cohen, Book of Mercy
 Robert Finch, Double Tuning. Erin, ON: Porcupine's Quill.
 Robert Finch, Sailboat and Lake.. Erin, ON: Porcupine's Quill.
 Paulette Jiles, Celestial Navigation
 George Johnston, Ask Again.
Irving Layton, The Love Poems of Irving Layton: With Reverence & Delight. Oakville, Ontario: Mosaic Press, 1984.
Irving Layton, A Spider Danced a Cosy Jig. Toronto: Stoddart.
Dorothy Livesay, Feeling the Worlds: New Poems. Fredericton: Goose Lane.
Miriam Mandel, The Collected Poems of Miriam Mandel. Sheila Watson, ed. Edmonton: Longspoon Press.  
 Michael Ondaatje, Secular Love, Toronto: Coach House Press,  ; New York: W. W. Norton, 1985
 James Reaney, Imprecations: The Art of Swearing. Black Moss Press.
 Charles Sangster, The St. Lawrence and the Saguenary and other poems (revised edition), edited by Frank M. Tierney (Tecumseh) 
 Raymond Souster, Jubilee of Death: The Raid On Dieppe. Ottawa: Oberon Press.
 Raymond Souster, Queen City. Ottawa: Oberon Press.

India, in English
 Kamala Das, Collected Poems Volume 1 ( Poetry in English ), Trivandrum: Kamala Das
 Nissim Ezekiel, Latter-Day Psalms ( Poetry in English ), Delhi
 Arvind Krishna Mehrotra, Middle Earth ( Poetry in English ), New Delhi: Oxford University Press, 
 Suniti Namjoshi, From the Bedside Book of Nightmares ( Poetry in English ), Fredericton, New Brunswick : Fiddlehead,

Ireland
 Seamus Heaney Northern Ireland native at this time living in the United States:
 Hailstones, Gallery Press
 Station Island, Faber & Faber,
 Sweeney Astray (see also Sweeney's Flight 1992)
 Verses for a Fordham Commencement, Nadja Press
 Thomas McCarthy, The Non-Aligned Storyteller, Anvil Press, London, Ireland
 Medbh McGuckian, Venus and the Rain, first edition (see revised edition 1994), Oldcastle: The Gallery Press
 Derek Mahon, A Kensington Notebook, Northern Ireland poet published in the United Kingdom
 Paul Muldoon, editor, The Faber Book of Contemporary Irish Poetry, an anthology of works by Patrick Kavanagh, Louis MacNeice, Thomas Kinsella, John Montague, Seamus Heaney, Michael Longley, Derek Mahon, Paul Durcan, Tom Paulin and Medbh McGuckian.

New Zealand
 Fleur Adcock, editor, Oxford Book of Contemporary New Zealand Poetry
 Charles Brasch, Collected Poems, Auckland: Oxford University Press, posthumous
 Alan Brunton, And She Said, New York:Red Mole
 Lauris Edmond, Selected Poems, winner of the Commonwealth Poetry Prize in 1985
 Bill Manhire, Zoetropes: Poems 1972-82
 Cilla McQueen, Anti Gravity
 Ian Wedde:
 Georgicon
 Tales of Gotham City

United Kingdom
 Peter Ackroyd, T. S. Eliot: A Life (biography)
 Samuel Beckett, Collected Poems 1930–78
 James Berry (editor), News for Babylon: The Chatto Book of Westindian-British Poetry
 Alison Brackenbury, Breaking Ground
 George Mackay Brown, Christmas Poems
 Charles Causley, Secret Destinations
 David Constantine, Mappa Mundi
 Gavin Ewart:
 The Ewart Quarto
 Festival Nights
 U. A. Fanthorpe, Voices Off
 Alison Fell, Kisses for Mayakovsky
 James Fenton, Children in Exile: Poems 1968-1984 Salamander Press version, poems from this volume were combined with those from The Memory of War to make the Penguin volume titled The Memory of War and Children in Exile; that combined volume was published in the United States, also under the title Children in Exile
 Roy Fuller, Mianserin Sonnets
 Geoffrey Grigson, Montaigne's Tower, and Other Poems
 Seamus Heaney Northern Ireland native at this time living in the United States:
 Hailstones, Gallery Press
 Station Island, Faber & Faber,
 Sweeney Astray (see also Sweeney's Flight 1992)
 Verses for a Fordham Commencement, Nadja Press
 John Hegley, Visions of the Bone Idol (Poems about Dogs and Glasses)
 Selima Hill, Saying Hello at the Station
 Liz Lochhead, Dreaming Franenstein and Collected Poems (includes Memo for Spring 1972, Islands 1978, The Grimm Sisters 1981)
 Medbh McGuckian, Venus and the Rain
 Derek Mahon, A Kensington Notebook, Northern Ireland poet published in the United Kingdom
 E. A. Markham, Human Rites
 Christopher Middleton, Serpentine
 Edwin Morgan, Sonnets from Scotland
 Blake Morrison, Dark Glasses
 Andrew Motion, Dangerous Play
 Grace Nichols, The Fat Black Woman's Poems, Virago
 Fiona Pitt-Kethley, London
 Peter Porter, Fast Forward
 Craig Raine, Rich
 Peter Reading, C
 Jeremy Reed, By the Fisheries
 Charles Tomlinson, Notes from New York; and Other Poems

United States
 John Ashbery, A Wave, awarded the Lenore Marshall Poetry Prize and the Bollingen Prize
 Charles Bernstein and Bruce Andrews, The L=A=N=G=U=A=G=E Book, "selected" pieces from the 13 issues of L=A=N=G=U=A=G=E magazine (Carbondale: Southern Illinois University Press)
 Joseph Brodsky, To Urania
 Alan Brunton, And She Said, Red Mole, book by a New Zealand poet published in the United States
 Louise Erdrich, Jacklight
 Seamus Heaney Northern Ireland native at this time living in the United States:
 Station Island, Faber & Faber,
 Verses for a Fordham Commencement, Nadja Press
 Hailstones, Gallery Press* Denise Levertov, Breathing the Water, her 19th book of poetry
 Sharon Olds, The Dead and the Living
 Michael Palmer, First Figure (North Point Press)
 Molly Peacock, Raw Heaven
 Kenneth Rexroth, Selected Poems
 Rosmarie Waldrop, Differences for Four Hands (Singing Horse)

Criticism, scholarship and biography in the United States
 'The Rhapsodic Fallacy' by Mary Kinzie appears in Salmagundi 65

Other English language
 Judith Moffett, James Merrill: An Introduction to the Poetry
 Hariprasad Sastri, editor and translator, Indian Mystic Verse, 3rd revised and enlarged edition; New Delhi: Macmillan (first edition 1941) anthology

Works published in other languages

Denmark
 Klaus Høeck; Denmark:
 Blåvand revisited, with Asger Schnack, publisher: Schønberg
 International Klein Bleu, publisher: Gyldendal
  Marienbad, publisher: Brøndum
 Henrik Nordbrandt, 84 digte ("84 Poems"); Copenhagen: Gylendal, 125 pages

Poland
 S. Barańczak, editor, Poeta pamieta ("The poet remembers"), anthology
 Stanisław Barańczak,  ("Fugitive from Utopia: On the Poetry of Zbigniew Herbert"), criticism; London: Polonia
 Czesław Miłosz, Nieobjeta ziemia ("The Unencompassed Earth"); Paris: Instytut Literacki
 Jarosław Marek Rymkiewicz, Mogila Ordona ("Ordon's Grave")

India
Listed in alphabetical order by first name:
 Faiz Ahmad Faiz, Nuskha-hae Wafa; Urdu-language* Nirendranath Chakravarti; Bengali-language:
 Roop-Kahini, Kolkata: Ananda Publishers
 Shomoi Boro Kom, Kolkata: Proma Prokashoni
 Rituraj, Nahin Prabodhachandrodya, Bikaner: Dharati Prakashan; Hindi-language
 Saroop Dhruv, Mara Hathni Vat, Ahmedabad: Nakshatra Trust, Ahmedabad; Gujarati-language
 K. Satchidanandan, Socrateesum Kozhiyum, ("Socrates and the Cock"); Malayalam-language

Other languages
 Christoph Buchwald, general editor, and Gregory Laschen, guest editor, Luchterhand Jahrbuch der Lyrik 1984 ("Luchterhand Poetry Yearbook 1984"), publisher: Luchterhand Literaturverlag; anthology; Germany
 Matilde Camus, Raíz del recuerdo ("Root of remembrance"), Spain
 Odysseus Elytis, Ημερολόγιο ενός αθέατου Απριλίου ("Diary of an Invisible April"), Greece
 Ndoc Gjetja, Çaste ("Moments"); Albania
 Rita Kelly, An Bealach Éadóigh, Ireland
 Alexander Mezhirov, Тысяча мелочей ("A thousand small things"), Russia, Soviet Union
 Eugenio Montale, Tutte le poesie, enlarged from the original 1977 edition; publisher: Mondadori; posthumous; Italy
 Jacques Prévert, La Cinquième Saison, published posthumously (died 1977); France
 Jean Royer, Jours d'atelier, Saint-Lambert: Le Noroît; Canada, in French
 Håkan Sandell, Efter sjömännen; Elektrisk måne ("After the sailors; Electric Moon"), Sweden

Awards and honors
Nobel Prize in Literature: Jaroslav Seifert, a Czech poet

Australia
 Kenneth Slessor Prize for Poetry: Les Murray, The People's Other World

Canada
 Gerald Lampert Award: Sandra Birdsell, Night Travellers and Jean McKay, Gone to Grass
 1984 Governor General's Awards: Paulette Jiles, Celestial Navigation (English); Nicole Brossard, Double Impression (French)
 Pat Lowther Award: Bronwen Wallace, Signs of the Former Tenant
 Prix Émile-Nelligan: Normand de Bellefeuille, Le Livre du devoir

Japan
 Japanese 100 yen note, starting this year and through 2004, features a portrait of Natsume Sōseki 夏目 漱石 (commonly referred to as "Sōseki"), pen name of Natsume Kinnosuke 夏目金之助 (1867–1916), Meiji Era novelist, haiku poet, composer of Chinese-style poetry, writer of fairy tales and a scholar of English literature

United Kingdom
 Cholmondeley Award: Michael Baldwin (poet), Michael Hofmann, Carol Rumens
 Eric Gregory Award: Martyn Crucefix, Mick Imlah, Jamie McKendrick, Bill Smith, Carol Ann Duffy, Christopher Meredith, Peter Armstrong, Iain Bamforth

United States
 Agnes Lynch Starrett Poetry Prize: Arthur Smith, Elegy on Independence Day
 Bernard F. Connors Prize for Poetry: Gjertrud Schnackenberg, "Imaginary Prisons", and (separately) Sharon Ben-Tov, "Carillon for Cambridge Women"
 Consultant in Poetry to the Library of Congress (later the post would be called "Poet Laureate Consultant in Poetry to the Library of Congress"): Robert Fitzgerald appointed this year in a health-limited capacity, but was not present at the Library of Congress.
 Frost Medal: Jack Stadler
 Pulitzer Prize for Poetry: Mary Oliver: American Primitive
 Fellowship of the Academy of American Poets: Richmond Lattimore and Robert Francis

Births
 Ailbhe Ní Ghearbhuigh, Irish-language poet
 Legna Rodríguez Iglesias, Cuban poet

Deaths

Birth years link to the corresponding "[year] in poetry" article:
 January 18 – Ary dos Santos, 46 (born 1937), Portuguese, of cirrhosis
 February 6 – Jorge Guillén, 91 (born 1893), Spanish
 February 8 – Ishizuka Tomoji 石塚友二 the kanji (Japanese writing) is a pen name of Ishizuka Tomoji, which is written with the different kanji 石塚友次, but in English there is no difference (born 1906), Japanese, Shōwa period haiku poet and novelist
 February 17 – Jesse Stuart, 76 (born 1906), American, from a stroke
 February 26 – Richmond Lattimore, 77 (born 1906), American poet and translator, of cancer
 March 3 – Tatsuko Hoshino 星野立子 (born 1903), Japanese, Shōwa period haiku poet and travel writer; founded Tamamo, a haiku magazine exclusively for women; in the Hototogisu literary circle; haiku selector for Asahi Shimbun newspaper; contributed to haiku columns in various newspapers and magazines (a woman)
 April 15 – Sir William Empson, 77 (born 1906), English critic
 May 19 – Sir John Betjeman, 77 (born 1906), English poet laureate, of Parkinson's disease
 July 2 – George Oppen, 76 (born 1908), American, of Alzheimer's disease
 September 14 (possible date) – Richard Brautigan 49 (born 1935), American novelist and poet, of a self-inflicted gunshot wound; the exact date of his suicide is speculative as his body is not found until October 25
 September 29 – Hal Porter, 73 (born 1911), Australian writer, novelist, playwright and poet
 December 8 – Edward James, 77 (born 1907), English poet and patron of the arts and of surrealism
 December 14 – Vicente Aleixandre, 86 (born 1898), Spanish
 December 29 – Robert Farren (Roibeárd Ó Faracháin), 75 (born 1909), Irish

See also

 Poetry
 List of years in poetry
 List of poetry awards

Notes

20th-century poetry
Poetry